"Tape Song" is the fourth single from indie rock band The Kills' third full-length album, Midnight Boom. It was released on November 16, 2008.

Music video
A video for "Tape Song" was released on November 3, 2008. It features footage taken by the band while they were on tour in the US with The Raconteurs.

Track listing

Personnel
The Kills
 Alison "VV" Mosshart - vocals
 Jamie "Hotel" Hince - drums, guitar

Technical personnel
 The Kills – production, artwork, layout
 Bill Skibbe – engineering
 Jason Lader – engineering
 Jessica Ruffins – engineering (track 1)
 Andy Taub – engineering (track 2)
 Tom Elmhirst – mixing
 Nilesh Patel – mastering
 XXXchange – additional production (track 2)

Charts

References

2008 singles
The Kills songs
Domino Recording Company singles
2008 songs